Derek William Douglas Bond MC (26 January 1920 – 15 October 2006) was a British actor. He was President of the trade union Equity from 1984 to 1986.

Life and career
Bond was born on 26 January 1920 in Glasgow, Scotland. He attended Haberdashers' Aske's Boys' School in Hampstead, London. Bond enlisted into the Coldstream Guards soon after the outbreak of war where his education marked him out for officer training, and he was duly sent to Sandhurst. Opting to transfer to the Grenadier Guards he was invited, with other hopefuls, to dinner by the Adjutant, Captain E H Goulburn. After being plied with drinks and subjected to a grilling, at which most of the cadets managed to maintain a suitable air of sycophancy, Bond was asked: “So, Bond, you were an actor! Aren’t all actors sh*ts?” After replying “no more than regular soldiers, Sir!” – his future was assured. After the evacuation of Dunkirk in May 1940 such was the apparent threat of invasion that the cadets were deployed in the defence of Camberley. However, with only one Bren gun between three hundred their effectiveness must have been limited. Finally, Bond was commissioned in July 1940.

Serving with 3rd Grenadiers, Bond saw action in Tunisia and on 12 December 1942 was wounded in the leg by a machine gun bullet. Evacuated home and awarded a Military Cross in February 1943, he dined with future prime Minister, Harold Macmillan who had commanded the same Platoon until wounded in the Great War.  He spent the last few months of the war in Stalag VII-A, a Bavarian POW camp.

He enjoyed a varied film, stage and television career, which began in 1938 with experience with the Finchley Amateur Dramatic Society. His conventional good looks secured him a number of dramatic and light comedy roles. He made a lasting impression in the title role of the Ealing Studios production of Nicholas Nickleby (1947).

As well as acting, he wrote a number of scripts; a stage play Akin to Death written in 1954, which he took on tour in 1955. His first drama for television was Unscheduled Stop, produced for ITV's Armchair Theatre in 1968 and directed by Toby Robertson.

He was president of the Actors' Union Equity for a tempestuous period during the 1980s. Because of his intention to perform in South Africa (the country's apartheid system was the cause of a UN-backed cultural boycott), a motion urging Bond to resign was proposed, but rejected, in July 1984. He resigned when a ban on members working in South Africa became union policy after his return to the UK.

Derek Bond was married three times. He died on 15 October 2006, at St George's Hospital in Tooting, London, and is survived by his third wife Annie, a son, a daughter and a stepson.

Selected filmography

 The Captive Heart (1946) – Lt. Harley
 Nicholas Nickleby (1947) – Nicholas Nickleby (title role)
 The Loves of Joanna Godden (1947) – Martin Trevor
 Uncle Silas (1947) – Lord Richard Ilbury
 Broken Journey (1948) – Richard Faber
 The Weaker Sex (1948) – Lt. Comdr. Nigel Winan
 Scott of the Antarctic (1948) – Captain L.E.G. Oates
 Marry Me! (1949) – Andrew Scott
 Christopher Columbus (1949) – Diego de Arana
 Poet's Pub (1949) – Saturday Keith
 Tony Draws a Horse (1950) – Tim Shields
 The Quiet Woman (1951) – Duncan McLeod
 Distant Trumpet (1952) – David Anthony
 Love's a Luxury (1952) – Robert Bentley
 The Hour of 13 (1952) – Sir Christopher Lenhurst
 Trouble in Store (1953) – Gerald
 Stranger from Venus (1954) – Arthur Walker
 Svengali (1954) – The Laird
 Tale of Three Women (1954) – Max (segment "Wedding Gift" story)
 Three Cornered Fate (1955) – Robert Parker
 High Terrace (1956) – John Mansfield
 Rogue's Yarn (1957) – John Marsden
 Gideon's Day (1958) – Sgt. Kirby
 Stormy Crossing (1958) – Paul Seymour
 The Hand (1960) – Roberts / Roger Crawshaw
 Saturday Night Out (1964) – Paul
 Wonderful Life (1964) – Douglas Leslie
 Secrets of a Windmill Girl (1966) – Inspector Thomas
 Press for Time (1966) – Maj. R. E. Bartlett
 When Eight Bells Toll (1971) – Lord Charnley
 Intimate Reflections (1974) – Bank manager
 Hijack! (1975) – Power boat owner
 Visions (1998) – Shooter (final film role)

Selected television appearances
 Picture Parade (co-presenter)
 Cooperama (with Tommy Cooper, 1966)
 Callan (1969)
 Thriller (1974)

References

Bibliography
War Memoirs, Steady, Old Man! Don't You Know There's a War on? Derek Bond, Pen & Sword Books Ltd, 1990.

External links

The Times Obituary

1920 births
2006 deaths
English male film actors
English male stage actors
English male television actors
Grenadier Guards officers
Recipients of the Military Cross
British Army personnel of World War II
Male actors from Glasgow
Coldstream Guards soldiers